Hartford Union Station is a railroad station in Hartford, Connecticut, United States on the New Haven–Springfield Line.

The Richardsonian Romanesque building was designed by George Keller, executed by Shepley, Rutan and Coolidge and built in 1889. A 1914 fire required a rebuild; the interior was renovated in 1987. It has been listed on the National Register of Historic Places since 1975.

Architecture

The station is located on the western edge of downtown Hartford, on a three-acre block between Union Place and Spruce Street on the east and west and Church and Asylum streets to the north and south. Opposite the main building on Union Place are a mixture of other old buildings and parking lots. To the west is a triangular parking lot and the viaduct carrying Interstate 84 and U.S. Route 6, which curves around the north of the station as well. Across Asylum on the south is Bushnell Park, also listed on the Register.

The main building is located between the tracks and Union Place. It is a three-story rectangular building in rough-faced Portland brownstone with two smaller, similarly shaped two-story wings on the north and south. The main building has a flat roof; the wings are gabled and tiled, with dormer windows piercing them at regular intervals.

On the east (front) facade, a wide set of steps rises to the main entrance, beneath a flat hood at the springlines of three of the large segmental arches that run across the first story. Above these is a stylized floral molded course. The second story has similar but smaller segmental arches set with a recessed panel and four-pane windows. The central bay has "1914" carved into its panel; all others are blank. The two wings have four-pane rectangular windows.

At the station level were originally four tracks (currently one) divided by a middle platform. Two sets of iron roofs create a train shed. On the wall side those roofs are supported by spiral-shaped iron brackets. In the middle columns and simple curved iron brackets support the trusses that hold up the shed roof.

The interior has been remodeled since the station was rebuilt. It is a mostly open area with stairs along the west wall leading up to the elevated tracks and benches along the east. Flooring is red tile. There are offices on the north and south; some look out over the main space.

History

The station was built in 1889, and served the Hartford and New Haven Railroad, Central New England Railway, Hartford and Connecticut Valley Railroad (all of which were acquired by the New York, New Haven and Hartford Railroad) and the New York and New England Railroad, but the entire structure had to be rebuilt after a fire in 1914. It was listed on the National Register of Historic Places as "Hartford Union Station" in 1975.

The station is currently served by one track and a side platform. The second track and platform were removed by Amtrak in the 1990s to reduce maintenance costs and because the underlying structure is no longer strong enough to support more than one train at a time. A  section of the platform was converted to high level for accessible boarding as part of the Hartford Line project. It features a -wide hinged edge that can be flipped up to allow wide freight trains to pass. The new platform opened on August 4, 2016. Hartford Line commuter rail service started on June 16, 2018. 

CTfastrak service began on March 28, 2015, after fifteen years of planning and three years of construction.

The I-84 Hartford Project may require realigning the highway and rail line, in which case new platforms would be constructed on the new alignment, though Union Station would continue to be used for ticketing and waiting area. The state released a slate of 5 options - some just west of the current station, others slightly to the south - in October 2017. A decision on which option will be built was expected in early 2018.

Services

Rail

Hartford is situated midway along the New Haven–Springfield Line, a non-electrified branch of the electrified Northeast Corridor. Amtrak operates four services through Hartford, with a total of about sixteen trains per day in each direction. Hartford Line commuter rail service is split between Amtrak trains and ConnDOT (CTrail) trains.

Bus
Operated by Connecticut Transit, Five local and four express routes operate along the busway and over on-street loops in downtown Hartford.

CTTransit's Hartford Division provides local and express bus service to the station on a variety of routes, including lines 30, 31, 32, 33, 34, 36, 37, 38, 39, 40, 41, 42, 44, 45, 46, 50, 52, 54, 56, 58, 59, 60, 61, 62, 63, 64, 66, 69, 72, 74, 76, 80, 82, 83, 84, 85, 86, 87, 88, 94, 95, 96, 101, 102, 121, 128, 901, 903, 904, 905, 906, 907, 909, 910, 912, 913, 914, 915, 917, 918, 921, 923, 924, 925, 926, 927, 950, Asylum Hill Shuttle (AHS), Columbus Boulevard Shuttle Connector (CB) and DASH.

Greyhound, Peter Pan and FlixBus serves Union Station with intercity bus service.

References

External links

Hartford – Hartford Line
Hartford Amtrak Station (USA Rail Guide -- Train Web)

Hartford
CTfastrak
Bus stations in Hartford County, Connecticut
Railway stations in Hartford County, Connecticut
Railway stations on the National Register of Historic Places in Connecticut
Stations on the New Haven–Springfield Line
Stations along New York, New Haven and Hartford Railroad lines
Stations along Central New England Railway lines
Stations along New York and New England Railroad lines
Hartford
Buildings and structures in Hartford, Connecticut
National Register of Historic Places in Hartford, Connecticut
Richardsonian Romanesque architecture in Connecticut
Railway stations in the United States opened in 1889
George Keller buildings
1889 establishments in Connecticut